The Embassy of Ireland in Switzerland is the diplomatic mission of Ireland to Switzerland. It is located in the Swiss city of Bern.

The embassy is also represented in Switzerland by Honorary Consuls in Zurich.

, the current Irish Ambassador to Switzerland is Eamon Hickey.

The Embassy of Ireland in Bern is also accredited on a non-residential basis to both Liechtenstein and Algeria.

See also
Foreign relations of Switzerland
Foreign relations of the Republic of Ireland
List of diplomatic missions of Ireland

References

External links
Embassy website

Diplomatic missions of the Republic of Ireland
Diplomatic missions in Bern
Ireland–Switzerland relations